Stachus is a large square in central Munich, Bavaria. The square was officially named  Karlsplatz in 1797 after the unpopular Charles Theodore, Elector of Bavaria. Munich natives seldom use that name, calling the square instead Stachus, after the pub Beim Stachus, once owned by Eustachius Föderl, that was located there until construction work for Karlsplatz began. Even the U-Bahn and S-Bahn announcements use the unofficial name.

Architecture
The most important buildings dominating the square are on the east side of the Karlstor, a gothic gate of the demolished medieval fortifications together with the rondell buildings on both sides of the gate (constructed by Gabriel von Seidl 1899-1902). The gate was first documented in 1301 and called Neuhauser Tor until 1791 when it was renamed Karlstor in honor of Charles Theodore, Elector of Bavaria. During the summer, a large fountain operates in front of the Karlstor and in winter an open-air ice rink is installed there. The most significant buildings on the opposite west side are the neo-baroque Justizpalast (Palace of Justice) and the Kaufhof, the first postwar department store built in Munich (by Theo Pabst, 1950-1951). A new building is planned for the Hotel Königshof.

The underground contains a large shopping center. Also between Stachus square and Marienplatz, the main pedestrian area of the city, (Neuhauser Straße / Kaufingerstraße) houses numerous shops and restaurants.

The Karlsplatz (Stachus) U-Bahn and S-Bahn station is located below the square. Stachus also serves as a hub for the city's tramway system, with a four track tram station located on Altstadtring, the Old Town's orbital road system.

External links

360° View of Stachus

Karlsplatz (Stachus)
Tourist attractions in Munich
Shopping districts and streets in Germany